The Three Graces may refer to:

 Charites, three goddesses in Greek mythology (Euphrosyne, Aglaia, and Thalia), in whom beauty was deified

Arts and entertainment

Paintings
 Primavera (Botticelli), a 15th-century painting by Botticelli
 The Three Graces (Cranach), a 1531 painting by Lucas Cranach the Elder
 Three Graces (Raphael), a 16th-century painting by Raphael
 The Three Graces (Rubens, monochrome), a 1620–1623 painting by Peter Paul Rubens
 The Three Graces (Rubens), a 17th-century painting by Rubens
 The Three Graces, an 1880 painting by Marie Bracquemond
 The Three Graces, a painting by Michael Parkes

Sculptures
 The Three Graces (d'Antoine) (Trois Graces), an 18th-century fountain by Étienne d'Antoine in the Place de la Comédie, Montpellier, France
 The Three Graces (sculpture), a 19th-century neoclassical sculpture by Antonio Canova
 The Three Graces (Indianapolis), a 19th- or 20th-century neoclassical sculpture by an unknown artist, located at the Indianapolis Museum of Art
 The Three Graces (Whitney), a 1931 fountain by Gertrude Vanderbilt Whitney at McGill University in Montreal
 Nymph (Central Figure for "The Three Graces"), a 1953 sculpture by Aristide Maillol
 Three Graces (Mack), a 1965 abstract sculpture by Heinz Mack, located at the Lynden Sculpture Garden
 Les Trois Grâces, a 1999 sculpture by Niki de Saint Phalle

Opera
 The Three Graces, a 1908 opera that opened at the Chicago Opera House and starred such performers as Trixie Friganza
 The Three Graces (Три грации), a 1988 Russian opera parody composed by Vladimir Tarnopolsky

Other uses
 Theological virtues, specifically faith, hope and charity
 The Three Graces, consisting of the Royal Liver Building, Cunard Building and Port of Liverpool Building on the Pier Head in Liverpool, England
 The Three Graces of Admin, three minor characters in the British situation comedy Campus
 "The Bachelor and Three Graces", a set of four sequoia trees growing, with intertwined roots, in Mariposa Grove, Yosemite National Park

See also 
 Charis (disambiguation)